General Jonathan Holbert Vance  (born January 3, 1964) is a retired Canadian Forces officer who served as a general in the Canadian Army. Vance was the chief of the Defence Staff from 2015 to 2021.

In July 2021, Vance was charged with one count of obstruction of justice, in relation to investigations of sexual misconduct. Prior to this charge, he boasted that he was "untouchable" by military police due to his high rank. On March 30, 2022, Vance pleaded guilty to the charge of obstruction of justice, and subsequently received a conditional discharge.

Early life, education and family

Vance was born on January 3, 1964, in Kingston, Ontario. At the age of 13, while his father Jack Vance—a Canadian Forces officer—was posted in Lahr, Germany, he joined the Army Cadets.

His father Jack Vance went on to the rank of lieutenant-general, and served as the vice chief of Defence Staff in 1985.

Vance himself went on to join the Canadian Forces in 1982, attending the Royal Roads Military College where he obtained a bachelor of arts (BA) in military and strategic studies in 1986. He also holds a master of arts (MA) degree in war studies from the Royal Military College of Canada.

Vance is married to Kerry Vance (née Wheelehan), a now-retired United States Army colonel in the Judge Advocate General's Corps.  The couple met when they were both serving in a NATO posting in Naples, Italy.

Military career 

Upon graduation in 1986, Vance was commissioned in the Canadian Forces as an infantry officer with The Royal Canadian Regiment. His father, Jack, was serving as the vice chief of the Defence Staff when he was commissioned.

He served as deputy commander of the Allied Joint Force Command Naples, and commander of the Canadian Task Force in Kandahar, Afghanistan in 2009 and 2010. He went on to be commander of the Canadian Joint Operations Command in September 2014.

Chief of the Defence Staff 

On April 27, 2015, Prime Minister Stephen Harper announced that Vance had been selected as the new chief of the Defence Staff. He formally succeeded General Thomas J. Lawson in the role following a transfer of command ceremony held on July 17, 2015.

Retirement

On July 23, 2020, Vance announced his intention to retire as chief of Defence Staff after five years in office, serving until his replacement would be named. Despite being a potential candidate for an upcoming vacancy as chairman of the NATO Military Committee, the federal government announced its intention not to pursue the competition.

On December 23, 2020, Prime Minister Justin Trudeau announced that Vance would be succeeded by Vice Admiral Art McDonald as Chief of the Defence Staff, with the change of command held on January 14, 2021.

Misconduct allegations and guilty plea

Shortly following his retirement, a report emerged detailing inappropriate behaviour from Vance towards two female subordinates, possibly violating "directives that govern personal relationships and such actions might contravene provisions in the National Defence Act (NDA) that relate to good order and discipline."

Following the allegations, an investigation into Vance's conduct was launched by the Canadian Forces National Investigation Service, a unit of the Military Police. Additionally, the House of Commons defence committee voted to study the matter, and the Department of National Defence committed to an external probe into Vance, which has since expanded to "also deal with rising concerns that the issue of sexual misconduct by the senior ranks could be a systemic issue in the Canadian Armed Forces".

On July 15, 2021, Vance was formally charged with obstruction of justice under Section 139 of the Criminal Code. The indictment focuses on allegations made by Major Kellie Brennan that he instructed her to lie when being interviewed by military police investigating charges against him. Vance was reportedly engaged in a 20-year relationship with Brennan, concurrent with his seniority over her in the military chain of command, and fathered two of her eight children. Brennan says that Vance told her that he was "untouchable" and that he "owned" the military police.

No charges were laid against Vance under the military justice system, following a review of the law by Morris Fish, retired justice of the Supreme Court of Canada.  Fish concluded that given Vance's high rank, it would not be possible to empanel a military jury, which must be composed of officers of equal or higher rank.

On March 30, 2022, Vance pleaded guilty to one count of obstruction of justice in the Ontario Court of Justice in Ottawa. As a result of the guilty plea, he was given a conditional discharge with 80 hours of community service and 12 months of probation. Vance's criminal defence lawyer, Rodney Sellar, also confirmed that due to the turn of events, Vance started to pay child support to Major Kellie Brennan. Furthermore, Sellar emphasized that Vance's reputation and finances have suffered immensely as a consequence of the criminal charge and subsequent guilty plea.  Nevertheless, due to the conditional discharge, although a finding of guilt was made, Vance was not convicted and he will not have a criminal record 3 years after the completion of his 12 month probationary period.

In May 2022, Vance was expelled from the alumni association of the Royal Military College of Canada over his guilty plea.

Awards and decorations

Vance has received the following orders and decorations during his military career:

 Vance was a qualified Paratrooper and as such wore the Canadian Forces Jump Wings with Red Maple Leaf.
 By virtue of his position, he served as an aide-de-camp to the governor general of Canada, and as such he wore the gold aiguillette to denote this position.
  At his request, Vance's appointment to the Order of Military Merit in the grade of Commander was terminated effective April 20, 2022 by the Governor General of Canada Mary Simon. He was appointed as an Officer of the Order in 2010 and upgraded to Commander in 2015.

References

|-

1964 births
Living people
Canadian generals
Royal Military College of Canada alumni
Canadian military personnel of the War in Afghanistan (2001–2021)
Chiefs of the Defence Staff (Canada)
Recipients of the Meritorious Service Decoration
Commandeurs of the Légion d'honneur
Commanders of the Order of the Star of Romania
People from Hastings County
Royal Canadian Regiment officers
Canadian military personnel from Ontario
People stripped of a British Commonwealth honour